Benjamin Yuen Wai-ho (Simplified Chinese: 袁伟豪; Traditional Chinese: 袁偉豪, born May 11, 1981) is a Hong Kong actor and singer contracted to TVB and Shaw Brothers Pictures. 

Yuen’s career started when he became the winner of Hong Kong's Mr. Hong Kong beauty contest in 2007. Yuen was the first winner from Hong Kong as the previous two winners, Matthew Ko and Francois Huynh came from Canada and France respectively.

In 2016, Yuen won Most Popular Male Character award at the TVB Anniversary Awards with his role in the critical acclaimed martial drama A Fist Within Four Walls. In 2018, he won the Favourite Actor awards in both Malaysia and Singapore with his role in Stealing Seconds.

Entertainment career
Benjamin Yuen started his career when he won the Yes! Magazine's School Grass Contest (校草選舉) in 1997. He was later reached with a contact by model agencies and officially became a model. This opened many other opportunities as Benjamin went on to act in a number of movies and started in a Vitasoy Commercial in 1998. However, in 2000, his popularity started to decrease and his last film was 香港處男. From then on Yuen had little work and eventually he had to leave the industry in 2002. He went out to do shipping for many wedding parties and helped design the area. He went on to find a job in Causeway Bay as a marketing executive and competed in the 3rd Mr. Hong Kong contest to reenter the entertainment industry after leaving it in 2002.

Mr. Hong Kong 2007
Benjamin Yuen entered the contest as a local candidate. He was a big favourite in the competition due to his past background in commercials and films. During the preliminary and secondary interviews, he bought along a guitar to play, in which eventually made him to choose the guitar as his talent in the finals. After he was selected as #7 in the contest, there were rumors everywhere from newspapers to reporters circulating that he was a playboy and liked to clubbing. Benjamin openly admitted to the deeds but said that the word playboy should not be used to describe the deeds. He explained that he liked to form bands and hanged out with his friends. There were new rules in the contest this year. One of them was the renaming of the groups. In 2005 and 2006, the contestants were grouped as Style and Fitness. However this year, the contestants who were 22 or younger were listed in the Young group and 23 or older were in the Mature group. Due to his age, he was in the Mature group formerly known as the fitness group. On August 11, 2007, he competed for the Mr. Hong Kong 2007 title. For the talent he chose to play and sing the song 浪子心聲 with a guitar. The song was originally sung by Samuel Hui. Afterwards he competed in swimsuit and interview. The interview question was also considered embarrassing as the topic was based on whether men liked sex. Yuen openly admitted to liking both women and sex. Despite a good performance in the three competitions, he lost to #11 Hu Zhiwei for the Mature Group title. Despite this, Benjamin went on to win the Back to Life competition, an all new competition established by TVB to give a chance for the contestants who did not win a group title to get back into the competition and fight for the title. Yuen went on to win the Mr. Hong Kong title after a strong performance in martial arts which was the last and final round of the top 3.

Mr. Hong Kong 2007 Scores and placements

Talent Portion: 109 Votes (3rd place in Mature group)

Swimsuit: 292 Votes (1st place in Mature Group)

Total: 401 Votes (2nd place Overall in Mature Group)

Afterwards the bar chart was used to announce the winner of the Young and Mature group, the winner of the Back to Life competition, and the overall winner. The bar chart had 16 boxes and the one who had the most boxes filled up was the winner.

Interview: No votes were taken

Mature Group: All 16 boxes out of 16 filled. However, there was a tie between Benjamin and #11 Hu Zhiwei in which Hu had all his boxes filled. However Hu had three more votes making him the Mature Group winner.

Back to Life Competition: All 16 boxes out of 16 filled.

Final competition between Young, Mature, and Back to Life winners: All 16 boxes out of 16 filled.

Acting career
After winning the 2007 Mr. Hong Kong, Benjamin Yuen signed a manager contract with TVB. He made his acting debut in the 2008 drama  Forensic Heroes II and played minor roles in television dramas for the first few years. In 2013, Yuen won the TVB Most Promising Male Artiste award at the 2013 TVB Star Awards Malaysia and was placed among top 5 for Favourite TVB Supporting Actor with his role in the medical drama The Hippocratic Crush II. He earned his first nomination for the Most Improved Male Artiste at the 2013 TVB Anniversary Awards as well. With his role in the 2015 drama The Fixer, Yuen won the Favourite TVB Supporting Actor award at the 2015 TVB Star Awards Malaysia and garnered his first nomination for the Most Popular Male Character at the 2015 TVB Anniversary Awards.

In 2016, Yuen gained recognition in the critical acclaimed martial arts action drama A Fist Within Four Walls, winning the Most Popular Male Character award at the 2016 TVB Anniversary Awards and was placed among the top 5 nominees for the Best Actor. In 2018, Yuen starred in the drama Stealing Seconds as the first male lead, for which he won the Favourite TVB Actor awards in both Malaysia and Singapore at the 2018 TVB 51st Anniversary Gala. With his role in the drama Another Era, Yuen was placed among top 5 for the Best Actor at the 2018 TVB Anniversary Awards.

In 2019, Yuen starred in the crime drama The Defected as the first male lead, starring opposite veterans Kara Wai and Philip Keung. Again, he was placed among the top 5 nominees for the Best Actor at the 2019 TVB Anniversary Awards. In 2020, Yuen released his first song (你與你的另一半). He composed the song while Bowie Cheung filled the lyrics. At the 2020 TVB Anniversary Awards, Yuen along with Pakho Chau won the Best Host award with The PakhoBen Outdoor Show. In 2022, he was one of the 12 contestants to participate in the second season of TVB's variety show: Dub of War.

Personal life
Benjamin Yuen and Bowie Cheung, who had been dating for three years, held an intimate ceremony in their swanky new apartment on 24 November 2020, with only close friends and family in attendance.

Due to their common interest in long-distance running, Yuen along with Joel Chan, Brian Tse, Jack Wu, Nancy Wu, Paisley Wu, Elaine Yiu, Selena Lee and Mandy Wong formed the group “Crazy Runner”.

Filmography

Television dramas (TVB)

Films

Dubbing 

 Dub of War's Second Season Graduation Project- Spider-Man: No Way Home (2022)- Peter Parker/Spider-Man (Peter 3)

Stage play

Shows hosted
2001: Wire Television YMC Channel "YMC People We Wet Web"
2007: 終極奪獎SHOW

Music Video Appearances

Awards and nominations

TVB Anniversary Awards

TVB Star Awards Malaysia

StarHub TVB Awards

People's Choice Television Awards

Hong Kong Television Awards

Music awards

Other awards

Reference

External links
Mr. Hong Kong 2007 Profile 香港先生競選的個人介紹網頁 
Official TVB Blog 袁偉豪網誌 

|-
! colspan="3" style="background: #DAA520;" | Mr. Hong Kong
|-

1981 births
TVB actors
Living people
21st-century Hong Kong male actors